Ardmenish is a largely cleared village on the island of Jura, in Argyll and Bute, Scotland. In 2003 the Rozga family were the sole inhabitants of Ardmenish.

History 
The name "Ardmenish" means "The headland of the narrow point" which is Gaelic/Norse.

References 

Villages on Jura, Scotland